Severino Caveri (29 May 1908 – 19 December 1977) was an Italian politician who served as president of Aosta Valley from 1946 to 1954, and again from 1963 to 1966. He was one of the co-founders of the Valdostan Union party, as well as serving as a national deputy from 1958 to 1963, as the president of the Regional Council of Aosta Valley from 1975 until his death in 1977.

Biography  
Caveri was born in Ivrea, Turin, in 1908. He was first elected to the Regional Council of Aosta Valley in January 1946. He was elected to the regional presidency in October 1946, where he served until 1954. In 1946, he co-founded the Valdostan Union party and served as its president until 1972. He was elected to the Chamber of Deputies from the Aosta Valley constituency in 1958, serving until 1963. He was then reelected to the Regional Council of Aosta Valley in 1963, again serving as president from 1963 until 1966. In 1975, he served as president of the Regional Council in 1975 until his death in 1977.

Legacy  
On December 19, 2017, the 40th anniversary of Caveri's death, the Regional Council of Aosta Valley held a dinner honoring him, including a speech by Regional Council president Andrea Rosset.

References 

1908 births
1977 deaths
Presidents of Aosta Valley
Deputies of Legislature III of Italy
Valdostan Union politicians
Action Party (Italy) politicians
People from Ivrea